The following is a list of presidents of HUR the Russian handball governing body

 
Handball-related lists